Puntius sanctus is a species of barbs native to a small body of water at Velankanni of Tamil Nadu, India.This species reaches a length of .

References

https://www.thehindu.com/news/national/kerala/a-silver-fish-from-velankanni/article31671645.ece
http://www.isisn.org/BR17(1)2020/560-567-17(1)2020BR19-579.pdf

sanctus
Taxa named by Mathews Plamoottil
Fish described in 2020